Jon Parrish Peede is an American book editor and literary review publisher, who served as the chairman of the National Endowment for the Humanities from 2018 to 2021.

Early life
Jon Parrish Peede was born in Mississippi, and he grew up in Brandon, Mississippi. His father was Dr Robert Louis Peede Sr and his mother, Mary Ann Parrish. He has three brothers.

Peede graduated from Vanderbilt University, where he earned a bachelor's degree in English. He attended the University of Mississippi, where one of his professors was William R. Ferris, and he earned a master's degree in Southern Studies. Peede and Ferris both served as chairman of the National Endowment for the Humanities.

Career
Peede was a book editor for the Mercer University Press from 1994 to 1996. He served as director of publications and later director of communications at Millsaps College from 1997 to 2003. He worked for the National Endowment for the Arts in senior roles from 2003 to 2011, including four years as director of literature grants. He was the publisher of the Virginia Quarterly Review at the University of Virginia from 2011 to 2016. 

When William Drea Adams resigned as the chairman of the National Endowment for the Humanities in May 2017, Peede became "the Trump administration’s new liaison to the N.E.H.". As acting chair in October 2017, he acknowledged that President Donald J. Trump wanted to eliminate the agency or at least reduce the budget. In March 2018, Peede was nominated by President Trump to become the new chair of the NEH. He was confirmed in April 2018. With bipartisan support in Congress, the agency budget dramatically increased during Peede's tenure from $147.9 million to $167.5 million. He also oversaw the federal agency's awarding of $75 million in CARES Act funding in direct grants and through state humanities council partnerships. 

In January 2021, Peede resigned as the head of the federal agency. In a press release, the NEH credited him with creating a new category of grants to support infrastructure and capacity-building at humanities institutions, awarding emergency grants for cultural organizations affected by natural disasters, funding a partnership with the First Nations Development Institute to support the revitalization of Native American languages, and creating the “A More Perfect Union” grant program to commemorate the 250th anniversary of the founding of the United States in 2026. 

Peede is a frequent advocate for improved K-12 teaching of U.S. history and civic education, and he awarded funding to create the Educating for American Democracy initiative that included 300 higher education and nonprofit partners and scholars. In partnership with the Teagle Foundation under the leadership of Andrew Delbanco, Peede provided NEH funding to support faculty salaries and programmatic expenses for undergraduate general education programs that include classics as well as contemporary literary works by authors of diverse backgrounds.

Peede is the co-editor of a collection of essays about Flannery O'Connor. He has written for numerous journals, magazines, and other publications, often on Southern culture.

His awards include an honorary degree from Manchester Community College in New Hampshire in 2019 and the President’s Medal of Distinction from California State University, Fresno in 2019.

Personal life
Peede has a wife and a daughter.

Works

References

External links 
 NEH Chairman biography

Living people
People from Brandon, Mississippi
Vanderbilt University alumni
University of Mississippi alumni
American book editors
American magazine publishers (people)
Chairpersons of the National Endowment for the Humanities
Year of birth missing (living people)